Harvey Kaye may refer to:

 Harvey Kaye (university administrator), former provost and CEO of Touro University
 Harvey J. Kaye, American historian and sociologist